Xylophanes aristor is a moth of the  family Sphingidae. It is known from Guatemala to Venezuela, Ecuador and probably Colombia.

The forewing upperside ground colour and the upperside of the body is olive-green and the forewing underside is orange. It is similar to Xylophanes crotonis and Xylophanes kiefferi.

Adults are probably on wing year-round.

The larvae probably feed on Psychotria panamensis, Psychotria nervosa and Pavonia guanacastensis.

References

aristor
Moths described in 1870
Moths of South America